Almost There may refer to:

 Almost There (film), a 2014 independent documentary film
 Almost There (album), a 2001 album by MercyMe
 "Almost There" (Andy Williams song) (1964)
 "Almost There" (Brenda Lee song), a cover song on the 1965 album The Versatile Brenda Lee
 "Almost There" (The Princess and the Frog song) (2009)
 Almost There (EP), a 2020 EP by Lucki